Dolichopus pantomimus is a species of longlegged fly in the family Dolichopodidae. It is found in North America.

References

Further reading

External links

 

pantomimus
Insects described in 1900
Taxa named by Axel Leonard Melander